Carl Lauri was a Democratic member of the Wisconsin Senate,  representing the 25th district from 1955 to 1963.

According to the Wisconsin Blue Book (1962), he was born in Superior, Wisconsin, and graduated from Superior State College in 1954. He formerly worked as a railroad clerk, and was a veteran of World War II. He was a delegate to the 1960 Democratic National Convention. He was also the chairman of the 10th District Democratic Party, and a member of the State Democratic Administrative Committee. Elected to the Senate in 1954; re-elected in 1958.

Lauri died  in 1990.,

References

Democratic Party Wisconsin state senators
Politicians from Superior, Wisconsin
University of Wisconsin–Superior alumni
20th-century American politicians
1924 births
1990 deaths